The Christian Democrats (KD) is a Christian-democratic political party in Finland.

It was founded in May 1958, chiefly by the Christian faction of the National Coalition Party. It entered parliament in 1970. The party leader since 28 August 2015 has been Sari Essayah. The Christian Democrats have five seats in the Finnish Parliament. It is positioned on the centre-right on the political spectrum.

The party is a member of the European People's Party (EPP). KD-lehti is the party's weekly newspaper.

History 
When the Christian Democrats was founded in 1958, as the name Finnish Christian League, the communist-dominated Finnish People's Democratic League was polling about 25 per cent and became the largest parliamentary grouping. That, together with lax alcohol laws, salacious publications and assistance from the Norwegian KrF, sparked the Christian initiative.

The 1960s were and 'incubation period', but there was a growing conviction of the need for parliamentary seats in the wake of liberal legislation. At the 'earthquake election' of 1970, after four years of Popular front government, the CD had a solitary Raino Westerholm elected. Westerholm was a party chair between 1973 and 1982. Westerholm polled a creditable 8.8 per cent at the 1978 presidential election. The modest 'Westerholm effect' was a backlash for long-serving Urho Kekkonen, who was backed by all of the larger parties.

Party was a junior coalition partner in government from 1991 to 1995, when it occupied the development aid portfolio. It was a soft Eurospectic party and stressed the importance of the principle of subsidiarity in European affairs. After being renamed The Christian Democrats in 2001 it moved to a pro-European stance. Bjarne Kallis, the party chairman between 1995 and 2004, was instrumental in the party's change of name and concern to attract a wider electorate, being able to draw votes from the Swedish People's Party and Finnish-speaking Conservative and Centre voters.

At the 2003 general election, The Christian Democrats polled their highest vote of 5.3 %.

English-speaking members of the party founded their own chapter in Helsinki in 2004. Its monthly meetings attract immigrants to participate in societal matters and the issues that are particularly important to them. In 2005, a Russian-speaking chapter was also founded in Helsinki.

Ideology 
The party describes itself as following the tenets of Christian democracy. It emphasizes "respect of human dignity, the importance of family and close communities, defending the weak, encouraging resourcefulness and individual and collective responsibility, not just for themselves but also for their neighbours and the rest of creation". Membership is open to everyone who agrees with these values and aims. The party also claims to be committed to environmental protection. It is also orientated towards socially conservative policies.

Politicians

Parliamentary election 1972 campaign event of Finnish Christian League at 1971.

List of party chairs
 Olavi Päivänsalo (1958–1964)
 Ahti Tele (1964–1967)
 Eino Sares (1967–1970)
 Olavi Majlander (1970–1973)
 Raino Westerholm (1973–1982)
 Esko Almgren (1982–1989)
 Toimi Kankaanniemi (1989–1995)
 Bjarne Kallis (1995–2004)
 Päivi Räsänen (2004–2015)
 Sari Essayah (2015–)

First vice chairs 
 Raino Westerholm (1971–1973)
 Ilmari Helimäki (1973–1982)
 Olavi Ronkainen (1982–1985)
 Marjatta Laakko (1985–?)
 Juhani Peltonen (-1991)
 Leea Hiltunen (1991–2003)
 Marja-Leena Kemppainen (2003–2005)
 Peter Östman (2005–2009)
 Sari Palm (2009–2011)
 Teuvo V. Riikonen (2011–2013)
 Sauli Ahvenjärvi (2013–2015)
 Tommy Björkskog (2015–2017)
 Tiina Tuomela (2017–2019)
 Peter Östman (2019–)

Party secretary 
 1958–1959: S. N. Venho
 1959–1965: Paavo Luostarinen
 1965–1978: Eino Pinomaa
 1979–1982: Esko Almgren 
 1982–1996: Jouko Jääskeläinen 
 1997–2002: Milla Kalliomaa
 2003: Eija-Riitta Korhola 
 2003–2007: Annika Kokko
 2007–2009: Sari Essayah 
 2009–2011: Peter Östman 
 2011–2021: Asmo Maanselkä
 2022–:     Elsi Juupaluoma

Current members of parliament
 Sari Essayah (Savo-Karjala constituency)
 Antero Laukkanen (Uusimaa constituency)
 Päivi Räsänen (Häme constituency)
 Sari Tanus (Pirkanmaa constituency)
 Peter Östman (Vaasa constituency)

European Parliament
Sari Essayah was the most recent MEP of the party; she was elected to the European Parliament in the 2009 election but failed to win re-election in 2014.

Election results

Parliamentary elections

Municipal elections

European parliamentary elections

Presidential elections

Indirect elections

Direct elections

Literature

Affiliated organisations 
 Christian Democratic Youth of Finland  
 Christian Democratic Women of Finland  
 KD News 
 Kompassi Think Tank

See also 
 Government of Finland
 Parliament of Finland
 Elections in Finland
 European People's Party
 Christian Democrats – similar party in Sweden
 Christian Democratic Party – similar party in Norway
 Nordic model

Further reading

References

External links
 

 
Christian democratic parties in Europe
Protestant political parties
Conservative parties in Finland
1958 establishments in Finland
Registered political parties in Finland
Political parties established in 1958
Social conservative parties
Member parties of the European People's Party